Rahmat Beri Santoso (born 24 February 2004) is an Indonesian professional footballer who plays as a forward for Liga 1 club Barito Putera.

Club career

Barito Putera
He was signed for Barito Putera to play in Liga 1 on 2021 season. Beri made his professional debut on 9 January 2022 in a match against Bali United as a substitute for Ambrizal Umanailo in the 87th minute at the Ngurah Rai Stadium, Denpasar.

International career
On 14 September 2022, Beri made his debut for Indonesia U-20 national team against Timor-Leste U-20, in a 4–0 win in the 2023 AFC U-20 Asian Cup qualification. In October 2022, it was reported that Beri received a call-up from the Indonesia U-20 for a training camp, in Turkey and Spain.

Career statistics

Club

Notes

References

External links
 Beri Santoso at Soccerway
 Beri Santoso at Liga Indonesia

2004 births
Living people
People from Jombang Regency
Indonesian footballers
PS Barito Putera players
Liga 1 (Indonesia) players
Association football forwards
Sportspeople from East Java